Sherburn-in-Elmet Airfield  is located  east of Sherburn in Elmet village and  west of Selby, North Yorkshire, England.

Pre-War and Wartime history

In the 1920s, the Yorkshire Aeroplane Club began operating here. The novelist, pilot, and aeronautical engineer Nevil Shute was a member, and on the club's management committee. At the time, the club was flying de Havilland Moths. In his memoir, Slide Rule, Shute records that ". . . the Yorkshire Club quickly attracted a fair cross-section of young Yorkshire men and women, so that a Sunday spent at the Club was a merry Sunday." He also met his future wife, Frances Mary Heaton, a physician, at the club. After establishing Airspeed Ltd., an aircraft manufacturing firm, he personally flew the first two test flights of the company's first aircraft here. It was a glider, known as the Tern, and was launched using a "very old Buick car" pulling a steel cable.

During the Second World War the airfield was used as a Royal Air Force station. From 1940 Blackburn Aircraft used a Ministry of Aircraft Production factory here to build 1699 Fairey Swordfish naval torpedo aircraft.

The Airborne Forces Experimental Establishment (AFEE) was moved from RAF Ringway to Sherburn on 17 June 1942. It was charged with developing the  means to deploy allied airborne forces and supplies on operations by Military glider, Parachute and other means. The AFEE moved to RAF Beaulieu on 4 January 1945.

The following units were also here at some point:
 No. 2 (Coastal) Operational Training Unit RAF
 No. 7 Ferry Pool ATA
 No. 7 Ferry Pilots Pool
 No. 30 Gliding School RAF
 No. 46 Squadron RAF (1941)
 No. 73 Squadron RAF
 885 Naval Air Squadron
 Leeds University Air Squadron

Post-war operations

Post-war, Sherburn has been used by private pilots and by aero clubs for training and leisure flying. The Yorkshire Aeroplane Club was based here for many years and organised several international air rallies in the early 1950s.

References

External links

Sherburn Aero Club Ltd

Airports in England
Transport in North Yorkshire
Royal Air Force stations of World War II in the United Kingdom
Airports in Yorkshire
Airfield